Edward Graham Paley (1823–95) (usually known as E. G. Paley) was an English architect who practised for the whole of his career from an office in Lancaster, Lancashire. He was born in Easingwold, North Yorkshire, and moved to Lancaster in 1838, when he was aged 15, to join Edmund Sharpe as a pupil.  Sharpe had established an architectural practice in 1835, and in 1845 he took Paley into partnership.  During the following years, Sharpe developed outside interests, and from 1847 Paley was responsible for most of the firm's work, carrying out commissions independently from at least 1849.  Sharpe withdrew from the practice in 1851, although it continued to trade as Sharpe and Paley until 1856.  Sharpe formally retired from the partnership that year, leaving Paley as sole principal. Paley continued to work without a partner until he was joined by Hubert Austin in 1868, when the practice became known as Paley and Austin. In 1886 Paley's son, Henry Paley (who was usually known as Harry) joined the partnership, and the name was changed to Paley, Austin and Paley, a title it retained until Edward Paley's death in 1895.  This list contains the ecclesiastical works Paley undertook during the time he was the sole principal in the practice, between 1856 and 1868. There are 30 new or rebuilt churches or chapels in the list, and 18 churches that underwent restoration or alteration.

During the time Paley was being trained by Sharpe the practice was involved mainly with ecclesiastical work, although it also undertook commissions for country houses and smaller projects.  When Paley became sole principal, he continued to work mainly on churches, designing new ones and restoring, rebuilding, and making additions and alterations to existing churches. In almost all his designs, Paley used the Gothic Revival style, initially with Early English or Decorated features. During the early 1860s he introduced Perpendicular features.  One church was built in Neo-Norman style, All Saints, Lupton, and one in Transitional style, St Matthew, Little Lever.  Paley also used the Neo-Norman style for St Michael's Chapel at Lancaster Moor Hospital.

Of his other churches, St James in Barrow-in-Furness, was described by Nikolaus Pevsner as the best church in the town. Hartwell, Hyde and Pevsner comment that St Peter, Bolton, is "formidable". Paley was an Anglican and most of his ecclesiastical work was carried out on Church of England churches: exceptions include St Mary and St Michael, Bonds, and St Peter, Lancaster, both Roman Catholic, and Clark Street Congregational Church, Morecambe. Most of the churches and chapels were built for local congregations, but Paley also designed chapels for Rossall School, and Lancaster Moor Hospital. Being based in Lancaster, Paley's commissions were mainly for works in the northwest of England, particularly in the former historical counties of Westmorland and Cumberland (later part of Cumbria), and Lancashire (parts of which were later incorporated into Greater Manchester and Merseyside). Further afield he restored St Cuthbert's Church, Crayke, in North Yorkshire, and designed Holy Trinity Church, Bradford, in West Yorkshire, and St Thomas' Church, Stockton Heath, in Cheshire. He also restored one church in Wales, St Garmon in Capel Garmon.

Key

Works

Notes and references
Notes

Citations

Sources

Gothic Revival architecture
Lists of buildings and structures by architect
 
Paley